Sterphus nigrita is a species of Hoverfly in the family Syrphidae.

Distribution
Jamaica.

References

Eristalinae
Insects described in 1781
Diptera of South America
Taxa named by Johan Christian Fabricius